Victoria Louise Sork is an American scientist who is Professor and Dean of Life Sciences at University of California, Los Angeles. She studies tree populations in California and the Eastern United States using genomics, evolutionary biology and conservation biology. Sork is a Fellow of the American Association for the Advancement of Science.

Early life and education 
Sork was born in Los Angeles. She earned her undergraduate degree in biological sciences at the University of California, Irvine. She moved to the University of Michigan for her graduate studies where she was awarded a PhD in 1979 for research on seed dispersal in pignut hickory (Carya glabra).

Research and career 
Sork studies the evolution of trees in California's oak woodlands and savannas.  She believes that trees are crucial determinants of particular ecosystems and that their considerable population sizes offer a good context for the study of evolution. Trees provide a living record of the changing climate, and scientists like Sork can sequence their genome to evaluate the impact of different environmental conditions. Sork uses genetic markers to monitor gene flow and genomics to understand genetic variation. She has focussed on Oaks (Quercus) and particularly Quercus lobata (Valley oaks), studying their local adaptation, the molecular ecology of their pollen, phylogeography of the genetic variation, hybridisation and how climate change will impact them.

In the 2000s Sork started working with Jessica Wright of the Food and Drug Administration on a project that evaluated which trees would be most able to adapt to a changing climate. This has involved gathering tens of thousands of seeds from almost one hundred locations, growing them to saplings in greenhouses and planting them in experimental gardens. She sequenced the genomes of the mother trees to compare with current genetic information, and combined this with how well the trees grew in different environments. She has investigated how the trees that are planted in the wake of the Californian wildfires will respond to a warming climate. Her studies showed that genomics can be used to inform strategies for conservation, emphasising the need for planting trees that can withstand changing ecosystems and higher temperatures. She showed that trees with "beneficial" genetic traits would have significantly higher growth rates than those without them.

Sork is part of a $10 million conservation strategy, the California Conservation Genomics Project, which aims to transform land is managed in California.

Academic service 
She was appointed Chair of the Department of Ecology and Evolutionary Biology in 2004. In 2009 Sork was made Dean of the UCLA College of Letters and Science Life Sciences Division. Under her leadership, UCLA have established new initiatives, including the La Kretz Center for California Conservation Science, and The Mildred E. Mathias Botanical Garden.

Awards and honours 
In 2004 Sork was elected a Fellow of the American Association for the Advancement of Science (FAAAS).
 Molecular Ecology prize (2020)

References 

Living people
Year of birth missing (living people)
University of Michigan alumni
University of California, Irvine alumni
Fellows of the American Association for the Advancement of Science